Silver Dollar Moment is the debut studio album by English indie rock band The Orielles. It was released on 16 February 2018, under Heavenly Recordings.

Release
On 24 May 2017, The Orielles released the first single from the album, "I Only Bought It For The Bottle".

The second single "Let Your Dogtooth Grow" was released on 24 October 2017. The music video to the single was released on 23 November 2017, and directed by Sam Boullier and shot in Manchester.

On 23 November 2017, the band announced the release of their debut album.

The third single "Blue Suitcase" was released on 16 January 2018. The band explained the single "is a track that was mostly written over the last few days of summer, inspired by events, discussions and ‘philosophical’ musings that took place in the studio during the recording of the album."

Critical reception
Silver Dollar Moment was met with "generally favorable" reviews from critics. At Metacritic, which assigns a weighted average rating out of 100 to reviews from mainstream publications, this release received an average score of 77, based on 12 reviews. Aggregator Album of the Year gave the release a 75 out of 100 based on a critical consensus of 16 reviews.

Tim Sendra from AllMusic said of the album: "With a happily loose rhythm section, alternately shimmering and biting guitar, groovy keyboards, and songs that bob and weave like flyweight boxers, the sound they get on their debut album, Silver Dollar Moment, is fully formed and more impressively together than any baggy band bar. Each song is a perfectly constructed sonic treat, with the band and producer Marta Salongi never adding too much to the arrangements while still slipping in interesting little bits like synth drums, digitally warped guitars, and vocal harmonies here and there to keep listeners on their toes and dancing"

Accolades

Track listing

Personnel

Musicians
 Esme Hand-Halford – vocals, drums, bass
 Sidonie Hand-Halford – vocals, drums
 Henry Carlyle Wade – piano, guitar, backing vocals
 Lucy Power – flute

Production
 Marta Salogni – producer, engineer

Charts

References

2018 albums
Heavenly Recordings albums